Mission Branch is a stream in Bates County in the U.S. state of Missouri. It is a tributary of Sycamore Branch.

Mission Branch took its name from an Indian mission near its banks.

See also
List of rivers of Missouri

References

Rivers of Bates County, Missouri
Rivers of Missouri